Matvey Frantskevich (born 18 March 1995) is a Belarusian professional football coach and former player.

References

External links

Profile at Belshina website

1995 births
Living people
Belarusian footballers
Association football goalkeepers
FC Belshina Bobruisk players
FC Torpedo Minsk players
FC Osipovichi players
FC Gorodeya players
FC Smorgon players